The 2012 FIM Ice Speedway World Championship was the 2012 version of FIM Individual Ice Racing World Championship season. The world champion was determined by eight races hosted in four cities, Krasnogorsk, Ufa, Assen and Uppsala between 4 February and 1 April 2012.

Final Series

Classification

See also 
 2012 Team Ice Racing World Championship
 2012 Speedway Grand Prix in classic speedway

References 

Ice speedway competitions
World